Tracey Takes On... is an American sketch comedy series starring Tracey Ullman. The show ran for four seasons on HBO and was commissioned after the success of the 1993 comedy special Tracey Ullman Takes on New York. Each episode focuses on specific subject in which Ullman and her cast characters comment on or experience through a series of sketches and monologues.

Unlike her previous Fox show, Tracey Takes On... was filmed without a studio audience, on location, single-camera; instead of upwards of a hundred characters, the show focused on a steady rotation of nearly 20. "I wanted to do a show where you could get familiar with the characters, where I could express a point of view, where we could get controversial [...] I also didn't want to do a series where I had to do 22 or 26 episodes a year. I have two children and have a husband, and there are other things I'd like to do during the year. Ten shows is a good number, and HBO gives me a great (artistic) freedom," said Ullman in 1996. The only character to return from the original Tracey Ullman Show was Kay Clark, as Ullman was the sole creator. Former cast member Julie Kavner became a recurring guest star in the series.

In 1998, a book based on the series, Tracey Takes On was released. In 2003, the character Ruby Romaine was spun-off into the HBO television special, Tracey Ullman in the Trailer Tales.

Premise
Tracey Ullman and her cast of characters "take on" a different subject for each episode of the series.

Production

Conception and development
In 1990, Ullman's husband Allan McKeown, a founding member of Meridian consortium, placed a bid for an ITV television franchise in South East England. Along with the bid he included a potential programming lineup which included a Tracey Ullman special. Ullman, who had just ended four seasons of her eponymous Fox series, had just given birth to their second child and was quite content staying at home. In September 1991, McKeown was elated when he was informed that his bid was successful; he was subsequently responsible for all of Meridian's comedy programming. Ullman dreaded the idea of doing another show. "I was really not prepared to do TV again. I had an extraordinary run at FOX in the late '80s with the Tracey Ullman Show, and couldn't imagine putting forth that amount of energy again. [...] The type of makeups I liked to disguise myself under had not been conducive to a live show [...] Once I inhaled so much remover that I passed out on the makeup room floor. I was resuscitated and went out to give a terrific performance, even though I can't remember being there." She had a year to deliver the show. The 1993 special Tracey Ullman: A Class Act, a satire about the British class system, was shot entirely on location and co-starred actor Michael Palin. The show's success led to American cable television network HBO becoming interested in having Ullman do a special for them. The only caveat was that she take on a more "American" subject. She chose New York City. That special, Tracey Ullman Takes on New York, was an award-winning success. HBO then broached the idea of a "Takes on" series.

Ullman was unsure if she could do it without the help of her "mentor" James L. Brooks who helped launch her American career with The Tracey Ullman Show. "Last year, I was 35 years old, and I thought, 'It's time to do it myself really. I thought, 'I know the premise, I know what I want to do...' I sat at the head of the table and made myself a boss."  Production on season one of Tracey Takes On... began in Los Angeles in 1995. Characters created for her previous two HBO comedy specials were carried over for the series: gay airline steward Trevor Ayliss, British Conservative MP wife Virginia Bugge, British magazine editor Janie Pillsworth, Long Island housewife Fern Rosenthal, and faded Hollywood actress Linda Granger.

Ullman was thrilled with the artistic freedom working in cable television allotted her, specifically HBO. "If we did the story line with me and [Julie Kavner] as gay golfers on network TV, Johnson & Johnson would pull their advertising, then there'd be a big piece in USA Today, and it would be a headache. HBO let us have fun with it, and when Julie and I come out at the end, it's in the most wonderful way. Our Romance show may be a bit sappy, but it's more of a battle theme, something that will get people talking."

Production on Tracey Takes On... began each year in February with a staff retreat. Three months would then be spent writing the scripts. Pre-production would follow in July and August with filming commencing in September and wrapping in November. The completed season would "ideally" get delivered to HBO by December.

The series came to a close after a four season run in 1999. Ullman began conceiving a new show in which she'd play only one or two characters with minimal makeup. "This time I'll play one or two characters [instead of all the characters]. I just don't want to put all that rubber on my face. That began to get really tedious. I've got make it easier on myself, and it'll be easier if I don't have to spend ten hours in make-up."

Format
A typical episode consists of two or three long sketches with interstitial character monologues all focusing on the episode's subject. However, every season featured one or two episodes which deviated from the show's regular format in favor of a single storyline (e.g., "Vegas", "Hollywood”, "Road Rage”, "The End of the World").

Opening title sequence and theme song
Each episode of season one opened with Ullman asleep in bed, musing about the topic she would be taking on in that particular episode. This was her only appearance out of character in the show. This would end up becoming an issue for some viewers as many were unaware that Ullman was playing every character. The theme song was an original song performed by Ullman, describing the show's characters as "company in between [her] ears."

A new opening was conceived for season two in which she opened the show with an anecdote or monologue in relation to each episode's subject. The show's theme song was also changed to her 1983 cover version of the Kirsty MacColl song "They Don't Know", with Ullman and her characters lip-syncing and dancing to it.

In February 1998, Ullman revealed that some viewers were still unaware that she was playing all the characters, "We still get letters asking, 'Can I have a picture of Tracey and the rest of the cast?'"

Advertising
Famed caricaturist Al Hirschfeld's artistic rendering of Ullman surrounded her characters was used to promote the show's third season.

In 1999, Ullman was featured in a Got Milk? ad campaign, along with three of her Tracey Takes On... characters, Kay Clark, Linda Granger, and Hope Finch.

Character origins and development

All of the characters in Tracey Takes On were original creations. Ullman shied away from doing straight-up impersonations of celebrities believing it was Saturday Night Live territory. She instead chose to do amalgamations – a combination of many real-life everyday people, and in some instances, famous ones.

The only character to return from The Tracey Ullman Show was Kay Clark, as Ullman was the sole creator. Fox owned the rights to all the other characters that appeared on that show. "I love Kay. I'm very fond of her. This little British spinster - she's so courageous, and to think she's sort of on national television in America is rather thrilling to me when I used to witness her in the local bank in my village. She'd say, 'Hello, Miss Ullman. How's Hollywood?' And to think she's on American television and - she doesn't know!"

The characters Trevor Ayliss, Virginia and Timothy Bugge, and Janie Pillsworth, along with her mother Jackie were originally created for the 1993 British comedy special Tracey Ullman: A Class Act.

Trevor was based on a real British Airways steward and an observation Ullman made about crewmen who would "butch up" once they made their way out of the galley. "I love Trevor. I've always wanted to do one of those gay air stewards because they're always so lovely to me. As Linda [Granger] says (lower-ing her voice to the throaty, teeth-clenched contralto of the washed-up Linda Granger): "I have a wonderful homosexual fan base, and I love them!" Since playing the character, every male steward Ullman has encountered is convinced that she based it on them. "And I always say I did. I go, 'You're right, I based it on you,' because that way I get free caviar." Fashion magazine editor Janie Pillsworth was an amalgamation of British editors such as Tina Brown and Anna Wintour.

The characters Fern and Harry Rosenthal and Linda Granger were created for Tracey Ullman Takes on New York. Ullman had toyed with the idea of giving Fern her own show but found that playing Fern left her feeling like a limp rag and that her husband avoided her like the plague. "I had seen this kind of woman many times in New York over the years. 'Loud, emotional with 'I'm from the suburbs' written all over her. She sat behind me at matinees of Cats and Les Misérables, not too shy to shout out to the performers, "Speak up, darling, we can't hear you!'"

When asked how many different actresses and celebrities she was channeling when portraying washed-up Hollywood actress Linda Granger, and who they were, Ullman cited Loni Anderson and actresses that ended up guest-starring in episodes of Murder, She Wrote, "The kind of women that Ruby Romaine made up."

Feeling that it would have been passé to play a talent agent, Ullman opted instead to play an attorney, Sydney Kross, apropos in the wake of the OJ Simpson trial and Court TV. Critics immediately took note of the character’s uncanny resemblance to real-life attorney Leslie Abramson, who defended Lyle and Erik Menendez. "She has a fascinating look [...] I think she'll recognize herself physically but not her personality.... I've got some things physically which [aren't her]. I've [had] some teeth [made] that look like sharks. I've got some things physically which [aren't her]. I've [had] some teeth [made] that look like sharks'. I had the glasses, the suit, but then I put these teeth in, and it made me move my mouth in a certain way. And I filed my nails square. Women in L.A. have these square white nails, reeeelly square...." When it came to Sydney's personality, Ullman found inspiration from an agent she had in Los Angeles named Holly, "who was insane." Always wanting to find some redeeming quality in all her characters, she was found herself stuck at first when it came Sydney. "[I]t seemed she had no redeeming features: she horrid, cold, impersonal." But then she found a "humanizing trait": loneliness. "She's so aggressive, and so ugly! She's got adult acne, and her teeth are terrible! [...] She became sort of appealing to me. All of my characters have a sadness or inadequacy about them."

Her Royal Highness is a conglomeration of Queen Elizabeth's voice, Princess Margaret's lifestyle, the Dutchess of Kent's hats, and Princess Anne's teeth. Ullman sent a copy of the show's Royalty episode to Princess Diana feeling that she could use a laugh, and Diana, through her lady-in-waiting, expressed that she had enjoyed it.

The show's Asian doughnut shop owner, Mrs. Noh Nang Ning was modeled after a real-life doughnut shop owner Ullman met while writing the show's first season in Los Angeles. The character was the show's only encounter with controversy. An Asian American watchdog group protested the show, calling the character stereotypical and racist, and asked HBO to remove the character. HBO defended Ullman stating, "Tracey Ullman is a brilliant satirist and comedienne, and all of her work is in the spirit of fun and good humor." On the controversy Ullman stated: "My criteria for doing a character is do they exist, do they talk like this, would they indeed run a doughnut establishment? And I think Mrs. Noh Nang Ning meets all of that [...] Asian people don't necessarily see themselves in mainstream television and certainly not comic situations and after Mickey Rooney at Breakfast At Tiffany's I can understand why they're a little gun-shy." The controversy later become comic fodder in season four when Ruby Romaine announces that she was behind Mickey Rooney's look in Breakfast At Tiffany's. True to form, Ruby doesn't get all the hubbub and declares that she should have won an Oscar. Mrs. Noh Nang Ning was retired after season three; Ullman had been complaining for years that the character's makeup felt like being buried alive. Ironically, minorities made up the show's largest fan base – even those in the Asian community. "It's such a diverse audience that I get. They're all those characters that I portray that are supposed to be politically incorrect. I get these Asian teen-agers who come up and I think, 'Aren't you supposed to be offended by my doughnut-shop lady?' and they go, 'Oh, no! There's no one like that on TV. That's like my grandmother. I'd rather you do it than no one at all.'"

Ruby Romaine, who Ullman has described as "pure Hollywood white trash", was based on many of the Hollywood union makeup artists sent to make her up over the years. Romaine's look was inspired by Romaine Greene, a hairstylist who worked on many of Woody Allen's films. The voice was inspired by Florence Aadland, mother to actress Beverly Aadland, who at 15 had an affair with a 48-year-old Errol Flynn. Ullman played Florence on Broadway in the 1991 one-woman show The Big Love based on the 1961 book. She spent hours listening to audio recordings of the late Florence dictating her memoir to writer Tedd Thomey. There are parallels between Ruby Romaine's early days in Hollywood and that of Beverly Aadland's, specifically Aadland's affair with Erroll Flynn.

Beverly Hills madam, Madam Nadja was based on Hollywood madam, Elizabeth Adams (known as "Madam Alex"), "I love that she kept money underneath her bed. She never gets up all day. If she ever has to get out of bed, it's like, 'Dammit, I've got to get out of bed. I've got to get dressed.' That's when something major happens that she has to get dressed. She's very angry because she had to get out of bed today because of some stupid hooker in Venice."

The character Chic was based on a real New York City cab driver who once drove writer Allen Zipper to LaGuardia Airport. The line "You want to fuck me or you want to fuck my Mercedes" used in the series was an actual line that the driver used when talking about how women in Los Angeles only cared about money. Ullman had a similar experience and spent the entire ride wondering how she could turn herself into the driver. The character was also partially based on a guy she knew as a teenager in London who worked in restaurant who used the come on line, "Hey, darling, you like sex?"

Guest stars
Guest stars marked with an asterisk (*) represent those who made recurring appearances.

 Amy Alcott as herself
 Joan van Ark as herself
 Corbin Bernsen
 Julie Brown
 Timothy Busfield
 Ron Canada *
 Seymour Cassel *
 Billy Connolly
 Bob Costas as himself
 Kristin Dattilo *
 Melinda Dillon
 Richard Dimitri *
 Alastair Duncan *
 Chris Elliott
 Erik Estrada as himself
 Jon Favreau *
 Mo Gaffney *
 Judy Geeson *
 Gloria Gifford *
 Steven Gilborn
 Adele Givens *
 Joanna Gleason *
 Whoopi Goldberg
 Huell Howser as himself
 Finola Hughes
 Alex Karras as himself
 Julie Kavner *
 Hugh Laurie *
 Hiep Thi Le 
 Jennifer Jason Leigh
 Tobey Maguire
 John Mahoney 
 Cheech Marin *
 Penny Marshall as herself
 Roddy McDowall
 Bruce McGill 
 Tim McInnerny *
 Michael McKean *
 Sam McMurray 
 Helen Mirren
 Joshua Malina *
 Alfred Molina 
 Olivia Newton-John as herself
 Natalija Nogulich *
 Todd Oldham as himself
 Carre Otis as herself 
 Maulik Pancholy *
 Ron Perlman
 Victoria Principal as herself
 Giovanni Ribisi
 Marissa Ribisi *
 Melissa Rivers as herself
 Glenn Shadix
 George Segal *
 Harry Shearer
 John Stamos
 Jeffrey Tambor
 The Roches as themselves
 Scott Thompson
 Liz Torres *
 Bradley Whitford
 Danny Woodburn *

Episodes

Reception

Awards and nominations

The series was nominated for 24 Emmy Awards, winning 6, including 1 in 1997 for Outstanding Music, Comedy and Variety Show. The show won a CableACE award in 1996 for Best Comedy Variety Series, 3 American Comedy Awards, and 2 GLAAD Media Awards in 1998 and 1999.

 American Comedy Awards
 1998–Funniest Female Performer in a TV Series (Leading Role) Network, Cable or Syndication
 1999–Funniest Female Performer in a TV Series (Leading Role) Network, Cable or Syndication
 2000–Funniest Female Performer in a TV Series (Leading Role) Network, Cable or Syndication

 CableACE Awards
 1996–Actress in a Comedy Series
 1996–Variety Special or Series

 Directors Guild of America
 1997–Outstanding Directorial Achievement in Musical/Variety

 Primetime Emmy Awards
 1997–Outstanding Variety, Music or Comedy Series
 1997–Outstanding Makeup for a Series
 1997–Outstanding Costume Design for a Variety or Music Program
 1998–Outstanding Hairstyling for a Series
 1998–Outstanding Costume Design for a Variety or Music Program
 1999–Outstanding Hairstyling for a Series

 GLAAD Media Awards
 1996–Outstanding TV Individual Episode ("Romance")
 1999–Outstanding TV - Individual Episode ("Religion")

 Online Film & Television Association
 1998–Best Ensemble in a Variety, Musical, or Comedy Series
 1998–Best Host or Performer in a Variety, Musical, or Comedy Series
 1998–Best Variety, Musical, or Comedy Series
 1998–Best Actress in a Cable Series
 1999–Best Costume Design in a Series
 1999–Best Host or Performer in a Variety, Musical, or Comedy Series
 1999–Best Variety, Musical, or Comedy Series

 Satellite Awards
 1998–Best Performance by an Actress in a Television Series - Comedy or Musical

 Screen Actors Guild Awards
 1999–Outstanding Performance by a Female Actor in a Comedy Series, Tracey Takes On...

Home media

VHS

DVD
On December 26, 2005, Tracey Takes On... officially came to DVD via HBO Home Video. The series had been previously scheduled to be released independently but was scrapped once HBO announced that it too was planning to release the series. The second season's opening "They Don't Know" lip-syncing title sequence has been removed and replaced with a blank black screen featuring an instrumental of the first season theme song and episode title. The closing credits feature the first season's theme song as well. Extras on the sets include the original HBO pilot Tracey Ullman Takes on New York (season 1), commentary on one episode per season by Tracey, previously unreleased Character Comedies, and character bios and photo gallery.

Seasons 3 and 4 were released by Eagle Rock as one DVD set on July 14, 2009 in the United States. While it claims to be "complete" the set's episodes are severely edited with some whittled down to a mere three to five minutes in length. "Tracey Takes On... Religion" is missing entirely. The set boasts 72 minutes of unseen bonus footage: three Character Comedies: Virginia, Ruby, Rayleen. The DVDs are region-free.

Streaming
Seasons 1 through 4 were released for purchase through iTunes and Amazon Video-on-Demand service in the United States in 2009, but are currently unavailable in either store. The episodes were heavily edited; some episodes were combined to make up for lost running time due to editing. In 2012, the entire series of 65 episodes could be streamed through Hulu, including all 15 unaired Character Comedies episodes.

References

Sources

External links
 

 
 
 
 Tracey Takes On... Emmy Awards
 

Tracey Ullman
HBO original programming
1996 American television series debuts
1999 American television series endings
1990s American sketch comedy television series
1990s American LGBT-related comedy television series
Primetime Emmy Award for Outstanding Variety Series winners
Primetime Emmy Award-winning television series
English-language television shows
Television series by Fremantle (company)